Ross Common Manor is a national historic district located in Ross Township, Monroe County, Pennsylvania.  It encompasses four contributing buildings and one contributing site on the historic estate of Ross Common Manor.  The manor house was built about 1810, and is a -story, five-bay-wide stone dwelling with a gable roof. The 1809 stone kitchen building was attached to the main house about 1890.  It was built by Congressman John Ross (1770–1834).  Also on the property are a stone ice house (1810), a -story frame grist mill, a former barn (1880) converted to a theater in the 1930s, and the Ross family cemetery with burials dating from 1814 to the 1850s. During the mid-19th century, the manor house was used as an inn and tavern.

It was added to the National Register of Historic Places in 1978.

References

Houses on the National Register of Historic Places in Pennsylvania
Historic districts on the National Register of Historic Places in Pennsylvania
Houses completed in 1810
Houses in Monroe County, Pennsylvania
National Register of Historic Places in Monroe County, Pennsylvania